Eraclio Petri (29 January 1929 – 10 November 1982), commonly known as Elio Petri, was an Italian film director, screenwriter, theatre director, and critic associated with the political cinema in the 1960s and '70s. His film Investigation of a Citizen Above Suspicion won the 1971 Oscar for Best Foreign-Language Film, and his film The Working Class Goes to Heaven won the Palme d'Or at the 1972 Cannes Film Festival. 

Petri's other notable films include The 10th Victim (1965), We Still Kill the Old Way (1967), A Quiet Place in the Country (1968), Property Is No Longer a Theft (1973), and Todo modo (1976). The Museum of Modern Art described him as "one of the preeminent political and social satirists of Italian cinema."

Early life
Petri was born in Rome on 29 January 1929. He was expelled for political reasons from San Giuseppe di Merode, a school run by a priest on the Piazza di Spagna, and joined the youth organization of the Italian Communist Party (PCI). He wrote for L'Unità and for Gioventù nuova as well as for Città aperta. He left the party in 1956 after the Hungarian uprising.

Career
Gianni Puccini introduced him to Giuseppe De Santis, who made him assistant to the director of Bitter Rice (1949). He collaborated, without being credited, on Rome 11:00 (1952), one of the least known post-war neo-realist movies. Petri wrote a book about the inquiry into the actual events depicted which was published in 1956.

He was script-writer and director's assistant on A Husband for Anna (La Fille sans homme, 1953), Days of Love (Jour d'amour, 1954), The Wolves (Homme et loups, 1956), The Road a Year Long (La strada lungo un anno, 1958) and La garçonnière (1960). During the period, Petri also wrote scripts for Giuliano Puccini, Aglauco Casadio and Carlo Lizzani.

After two shorts, Nasce un campione (1954) and I sette contadini (1959), Petri made his debut as a director with L'assassino The lady killer of Rome, 1961) based on a script co-authored with Tonino Guerra.His Days Are Numbered (I giorni contati, 1962), was his second film, again co-authored with Tonino Guerra. After two somewhat lesser films The Teacher from Vigevano (Il maestro di Vigevano, 1963) and the sketch Sin in the afternoon, included in High Infidelity (Alta infedeltà, 1964). Petri directed The 10th Victim (La decima vittima, 1965), a film with futuristic overtones also co-authored with Tonino Guerra. His film We Still Kill the Old Way (A ciascuno il suo, 1967) was adapted from the novel To Each His Own by Leonardo Sciascia), which deals with the individual's inability to cope with reality. The film was also the beginning of the collaboration with the script-writer Ugo Pirro which was to last until 1973.A Quiet Place in the Country (Un tranquillo posto di campagna, 1968), the last of his films co-authored with Guerra, focuses on solitude and the artist's romantic agony. The film won a Silver Bear award at the 19th Berlin International Film Festival. He then directed four films which earned him recognition for his analysis of schizophrenia. Investigation of a Citizen Above Suspicion (Indagine su un cittadino al di sopra di ogni sospetto, 1970) was about the police-force. The Working Class Goes to Heaven (La classe operaia va in paradiso, 1971) focused on the worker's condition. Property Is No Longer a Theft (La proprietà non è più un furto, 1973) emphasized the role of money in our society and how power destroys the individual. Todo modo (1976), which was adapted from the eponymous novel by Leonardo Sciascia, is about the warped psychic structure of the power moguls among the Christian Democrats. Investigation of a Citizen Above Suspicion won the Academy Award for Best Foreign Language Film.

In 1978, Petri directed Le mani sporche, a version for television of Sartre's play Dirty Hands, starring Marcello Mastroianni. Due to copyright issues, the film has not been released outside Italy.Good News (1979), was produced by Petri and Giancarlo Giannini.

Final years
In 1981, Petri visited Geneva to direct Arthur Miller's new play The American Clock, with Marcello Mastroianni playing the lead role. Petri died of cancer on 10 November 1982 in Rome. He was 53 years old.

Filmography

References

Publications
 Roma ore 11 (Rome & Milan: Sellerio Editore Palermo, 1956; 2004).
 L’assassino (Milan: Zibetti, 1962). With Tonino Guerra.
 Indagine su un cittadino al di sopra ogni sospetto (Rome: Tindalo, 1970). With Ugo Pirro.
 La proprietà non è più un furto (Milan: Bompiani, 1973). With Ugo Pirro.
 Scritti di cinema e di vita, ed. by Jean A. Gili (Rome: Bulzoni Editore, 2007).
 Writings On Cinema & Life'' (New York: Contra Mundum Press, 2013). Ed. by Jean A. Gili

External links
 Official Elio Petri site
 
 Elio Petri retrospective trailer on Vimeo

1929 births
1982 deaths
Film directors from Rome
Giallo film directors
Nastro d'Argento winners
Golden Arena winners
Directors of Best Foreign Language Film Academy Award winners
Directors of Palme d'Or winners
Cannes Film Festival Award for Best Screenplay winners
Italian film directors
Italian screenwriters
Italian communists
Italian theatre directors